Ukkadam is a part of Townhall locality in the core part of the city of Coimbatore, Tamilnadu, India. Ukkadam Bus Terminal, which is one of the seven major bus stands in the city, is located in this neighborhood. Ukkadam is famous for its Fish Market, Jackfruit Market.

Transport 
Ukkadam Bus Terminus is located at Ukkadam serving the intracity bus services within the Coimbatore metropolitan area  and intercity bus services to Pollachi, Palakkad, Palani, Valparai and Thrissur.

Ukkadam Flyover
To ease the traffic congestion in Ukkadam signal and Aathupalam, an overpass flyover is being constructed at a cost of ₹265 crore in Ukkadam covering Sungam Bypass, Perur Bypass, Pollachi Road and Palakkad Road.

Politics
Ukkadam is a part of Coimbatore South (state assembly constituency) partially and Singanallur (state assembly constituency) partially which are part of Coimbatore (Lok Sabha constituency).

Coimbatore Metro
Coimbatore Metro feasibility study is completed and Ukkadam would be the hub for the metro trains with a three corridors towards Kaniyur, Coimbatore Integrated Bus Terminus and Bilichi. Whereas the other two corridors would pass through Ukkadam connecting Ganeshapuram with Karunya Nagar and connecting Karanampettai with Thaneerpandal.

Gallery

References 

Neighbourhoods in Coimbatore